Keenan Kampa (born February 3, 1989) is an American actress and dancer.

Career
Kampa started dancing at the age of four. She studied at the Conservatory Ballet in Reston. Kampa was raised near Reston, Virginia
From 2003 to 2004, she was part of the Boston Ballet's Summer Dance Program.

In 2005 and 2006 she participated in the American Ballet Theater's summer intensive program on a scholarship.

She entered the National Youth Ballet Competition in 2006 and won a gold medal.

In 2007, when she was 18 years old, she was invited to study at the Vaganova Ballet Academy in St. Petersburg, Russia, the second American to be admitted to the academy after Ryan Martin. After three years, she graduated at the top of her class and with a Russian diploma. She accepted a contract with the Boston Ballet after two seasons, she was invited to dance with the Mariinsky Theatre, becoming the first American in history to do so.  She returned to the United States in 2014 for hip surgery. She planned to return to Russia, but decided to remain in the United States.

Filmography
Swan Lake 3D - Live from the Mariinsky Theatre, 2013
Jerome Lejeune - To the least of these my brothers & sisters (documentary), 2015
The Jimmy Star Show with Ron Russell (TV Series), 2016
High Strung, 2016

Accolades
2006, National Youth Ballet Competition, gold medal
2012, Dance Magazine's "25 to Watch"

References

External links
 
 
 

American ballerinas
Boston Ballet dancers
People from Virginia
American actresses
1989 births
Living people